NGC 5879 is an unbarred spiral galaxy in the constellation Draco. The galaxy was discovered in 1788 by William Herschel. It is a member of the NGC 5866 Group.

References

External links
 
 

Unbarred spiral galaxies
5879
Draco (constellation)
NGC 5866 Group
9753
54117
Astronomical objects discovered in 1788